Malayappanallur is a village in the Kumbakonam taluk of Thanjavur district, Tamil Nadu, India.

Demographics 

As per the 2001 census, Malayappanallur had a total population of 1407 with 697 males and 710 females. The sex ratio was 1019. The literacy rate was 63.24

References 

 

Villages in Thanjavur district